The Florida Gators have two Gator basketball programs:

Florida Gators men's basketball
Florida Gators women's basketball